Mario Guarente (born 2 December 1983 in Potenza) is an Italian politician.

Former local leader of the Movement for the Autonomies, he joined the right-wing populist party Lega Nord in 2017. He was elected Mayor of Potenza at the 2019 local elections and took office on 20 June 2019.

See also
2019 Italian local elections
List of mayors of Potenza

References

External links

1983 births
Living people
Mayors of Potenza
Lega Nord politicians